Lake Ilsanjo is a man-made lake located in Annadel State Park east of Santa Rosa in Sonoma County, California, United States. It is a place for fishing and swimming, especially in the summer months. Entrepreneur Joe Coney originally owned the land that is now Annadel State Park and named the lake after his wife Ilsa and himself. Thus it came to be called Lake Ilsanjo. It drains into Spring Creek.

The lake is formed by a dam constructed in the 1950s. Originally the overflow drained to a gully during the winter months, but in 2003, the state spent almost $400,000 building a spillway and release valve to reduce downstream erosion. During the winter of 2007–08, park officials accidentally left the release valve open, causing the lake level to drop far below normal, exposing mudflats that would normally be underwater.

See also
Ledson Marsh
List of lakes in California
List of lakes in the San Francisco Bay Area

References

External links

Reservoirs in Sonoma County, California
Reservoirs in California
Reservoirs in Northern California